James Melvin Miles (born October 10, 1941) is an American politician and attorney, who served as Secretary of State of South Carolina from 1991 to 2003, and subsequently as chief of staff to Lieutenant Governor of South Carolina Andre Bauer.

Born in Norfolk, Virginia, Miles received his B.A. from Duke University in 1964 and J.D. from the University of North Carolina School of Law in 1969. Miles was admitted to the North Carolina Bar in 1969 and South Carolina Bar in 1971. He was an attorney in private practice in Greenville, South Carolina and was elected to the Greenville City Council in 1989. In 1990, Miles was elected as the first Republican Secretary of State in South Carolina since Reconstruction.

Miles attempted to abolish the Secretary of State office and vowed to investigate charity fraud in South Carolina. In 1994, South Carolina passed a law cracking down on charity fraud.

In July 2020, Miles was appointed as Acting CEO of Open Technology Fund in the U.S. Agency for Global Media, despite having no technological expertise  or experience in internet freedom issues.

References

1941 births
Living people
Duke University alumni
Politicians from Norfolk, Virginia
Politicians from Greenville, South Carolina
South Carolina lawyers
South Carolina Republicans
University of North Carolina School of Law alumni
Secretaries of State of South Carolina
South Carolina city council members
Trump administration personnel